Haighton is a civil parish in the City of Preston, Lancashire, England.  It contains seven listed buildings that are recorded in the National Heritage List for England.  All of the listed buildings are designated at Grade II, the lowest of the three grades, which is applied to "buildings of national importance and special interest".  The parish is entirely rural, and all the listed buildings are houses, farmhouses, or farm buildings

Buildings

References

Citations

Sources

Lists of listed buildings in Lancashire
Buildings and structures in the City of Preston